Štěpán Krtička (born March 19, 1996 in Prague) is a Czech film and television child actor.

He dubs films, series and PC games into Czech. Since 2008 he plays the drums with indie rock band The Colorblinds.

Filmography 
 Past na Ježíška (2006) TV .... Vašek
 O dívce, která šlápla na chléb (2007) TV .... Bláťucha
 Světla pasáže (2007) TV series
 Dítě hvězdy (2007) (fairy story)
 Taková normální rodinka (2008) .... raubíř Petr
 Little Knights Tale (2009) TV film and series .... Michal
 Dům U Zlatého úsvitu (2009) TV .... Ondra Pučalík

Dubbing (selection) 
Film
 2004 Bambi .... Young Flower (Stan Alexander)
 2005 Tarzan II .... Tarzan (Harrison Chad)
 2006 Brother Bear 2 .... bear Koda (Jeremy Suarez)
 2007 The Princess and the Pea (2002)
 2008 Hancock .... Aaron (Jae Head)
 2008 Whisper (2007) .... David Sandborn (Blake Woodruff)
 2008 The Nanny Diaries .... Grayer Addison X (Nicholas Art)
 2009 The Day the Earth Stood Still .... Jacob Benson (Jaden Smith)
 2009 Little Hercules in 3-D .... Curtis (Marc John Jefferies)
 2009 Young Andersen .... Tuk (Mikkel Konyher)
 2009 Shark Bait (2006)
 2010 Karla og Katrine (2009)
 2010 Alla luce del sole (Italy, 2005) .... Saro (Mario Giunta)
 2010 Gruesome School Trip (2005) .... Gino (Jim van der Panne)
 2010 Pokémon: Destiny Deoxys (2004) .... Ash Ketchum
 2010 Felix: The Toy Rabbit and the Time Machine (2005)
 2011 Bambi II (2006) .... Flower, Ronno (Nicky Jones, Anthony Ghannam)

Series
 2006–2008 Desperate Housewives (season 1–4) .... Porter Scavo (Shane Kinsman)
 2007–2008 Roman Mysteries (season 1–2) .... Jonathan Ben-Mordechai (Eli Machover)
 2008 Animalia .... Alex (Brooke Mikey Anderson)
 2010 The Mystery of Black Rose Castle (2001) .... Bobby (Travis Kisgen)
 2011 Shake It Up .... Ty Blue (Roshon Fegan)

References

External links 
 
 Štěpán Krtička at Dabingforum.cz
 Štěpán Krtička at Osobnosti.cz portal (in Czech)
 Štěpán Krtička at ČSFD.cz (in Czech)
 Štěpán Krtička at FDb.cz (in Czech)

Czech male child actors
Czech male film actors
Czech male voice actors
1996 births
Living people
Male actors from Prague